Metcard was the brand name of an integrated ticketing system used to access public transport in Melbourne, Australia. It was a universal ticket which allowed users to ride on the city's Metlink and Metropolitan Transit Authority network, consisting of suburban trains, trams, and buses, including the NightRider network. The Metcard was a credit card-sized ticket made out of cardboard and used a magnetic strip to store fare data. Metcard was operated by OneLink Transit Systems under a contract with the Government of Victoria which was managed by the Transport Ticketing Authority.

History

In July 1983, the Metropolitan Transit Authority was formed to integrate Melbourne's tram, train and bus services. The Metropolitan Transit Authority also integrated bus, train and tram ticketing using punch card and scratch card tickets.  Under the arrangements, the Government of Victoria collected all revenue from the sale of multi-modal tickets, which was then allocated to the various operators on the basis of an agreed formula.

Moves towards automated ticketing were first made in 1992. Tenders were called for the design, supply, installation and on-going maintenance of the system, with the OneLink Transit Consortium becoming the preferred tenderer in September 1993. The contract was signed in May 1994, with the major technology supplier being the ERG Group (now Vix Technology).

Testing of prototypes commenced in December 1993, and the roll-out of the system was carried out from August 1996 to April 1998. Public field trials were carried out on buses from 20 August 1996, and on rail services from 18 September 1996. Acceptance occurred in November 1997. The system commenced full revenue service from May 1998 at a cost of $330 million. Contractual issues between OneLink and the Victorian Government were not settled until May 2002 with the payment of up to $65 million in a staged settlement.

In 2002, Metcard replaced the functionally identical yet technically simpler punch tickets and scratchie tickets, which were easy to cheat.
In 2009, the rollout of a new smartcard ticketing system, Myki, would signal the end of the Metcard. The Metcard system was deactivated on 29 December 2012.

Controversy
Controversy surrounded Metcard at its introduction, due to cost over-runs, the abolition of tram conductors and the unreliability of ticket purchasing and validation machines. The ticket vending machines were frequently attacked by vandals (often by pouring liquids into the coin slot), and underwent several revisions to their design.

An audit released by the Victorian Government in 2001 showed over 1 in 4 (27.2%) of machines at railway stations did not work, and 11.9% of mobile equipment in buses and trams were non-operational. The State Government renegotiated with ticketing network contract operator OneLink Transit Systems to improve the service to commuters. Following these improvements, a 2002 audit showed an increase in availability of machines to 92.1% at railway stations, and 98.3% on buses and trams. Usability was also improved, with tram machines able to sell daily tickets. Furthermore, vandalism across the network dropped by 62% between 2001 and 2002.

V/Line tickets were aligned with the Metcard system in April 2006, with each V/Line ticket to stations in the Metcard area having the relevant zones printed on them. In March 2007 the Nightrider bus service was also brought under the Metcard system. and zone 3 of the system was abolished, being merged with zone 2.

The original Metcard contract with OneLink was to last nine years, expiring in March 2007. In 2005 the contract was amended to permit the system to be extended and modified as work on the replacement Myki project progressed, with the contract being able to be terminated on six months notice.

Operation

All forms of public transport could be accessed by using a single Metcard. Metcards were a time and zone based ticket, with validity periods ranging from 2 hours to yearly, and two zones covering the Melbourne metropolitan area.

When the system was in full operation, Metcards could be purchased from:
 Ticket Vending Machines at rail stations 
 Ticket vending machines on board trams (coin only) and the Stony Point train
 Bus drivers
 Premium (staffed) stations
 The Met Shop (inside the Melbourne Town Hall on Swanston Street)
 Authorised Metcard outlets such as newsagencies and milk bars
 Online
 By phone

Ticket availability varied, with the sources above each stocking slightly different ranges beyond the standard two-hour, daily and seniors tickets. Availability on board buses was particularly restricted, with neither the Sunday Saver nor off-peak tickets being available from drivers. Similarly, ticket vending machines at railway stations did not stock Sunday Savers or some types of off-peak tickets. Payment options varied from coin-only (small Metcard machines on trams and at railway stations), EFTPOS, coin and some notes (large ticket machines at stations) to EFTPOS, credit card, coin and all notes (premium railway stations).

In March 2008, the new route 401 bus service from North Melbourne railway station to the Royal Melbourne Hospital and University of Melbourne became the first and only bus route in Melbourne that required the purchase of a Metcard before travel.

Metcards were 'validated' when entering or exiting railway stations, and getting on trams or buses. The first validation printed an expiry date and time on the back of the ticket. Subsequent validations of most types of tickets did not print extra times but the data was intended to be used to count passenger numbers (in order to improve transport services). Revalidation of already validated tickets, whilst functionally unnecessary, was and is still required by law and occasional campaigns continue to remind passengers of this.

When transport operations were franchised, revalidation data was also used to apportion revenue share between operators. This has since been abandoned in favour of fixed percentage allocations (40% train, 40% tram and 20% bus).

With most railway stations not having ticket-operated barriers and trams not having conductors, enforcement was and is still the responsibility of roaming Authorised Officers (ticket inspectors). Authorised Officers (AOs) check that passengers have the correct ticket and, if using a concession ticket, have a suitable concession card. AOs did not issue fines directly but issued an infringement notice. The passenger then received a letter from the Department of Transport, who could issue a fine. Passengers could either pay the fine, seek an internal review, or contest it in court.

Zones and fares

Metcard tickets function within a zonal system.  Melbourne is divided into two zones: Zone 1 (Yellow) and Zone 2 (Blue). Until early 2007, there was also a Zone 3 (Red), but this was abolished by extending Zone 2 to all areas covered by Zone 3. The two zones form concentric rings, with Zone 1 comprising the inner suburbs, and Zone 2 covering the remainder of metropolitan Melbourne. Zone 3 covered the outer eastern, southern and south-eastern metropolitan area, but this area is now part of Zone 2.  Zone overlap areas exist on the borders of the zones. In these areas tickets for either zone are acceptable. The fare payable depends on the zone or zones in which the passenger travels, with higher fares for trips that include both travel zones

A separate fare and ticketing system exists for V/Line (country) services. However, since April 2006 holders of V/Line tickets to Melbourne have had access to both Zone 1 and 2 without needing to purchase another ticket. V/Line tickets to Zone 2 stations are valid for Zone 2 only. Fares in most towns just outside Melbourne were also aligned to Zone 2 Metcard prices as part of this integration.

A range of tickets was available, including two-hour, all-day, weekly, monthly and annual tickets. There were also concession tickets for students, seniors and others. In 2010, a daily Zone 1 and 2 full-fare (as distinct from concession fare) ticket cost A$2.70, and a weekly Zone 1 and 2 ticket cost A$10.40. Prices generally rise by inflation (CPI) on 1 January each year, though there have been occasional higher than CPI increases.

Transition to Myki

The Metcard system was originally scheduled to be replaced in 2008 by a contactless smart card ticketing system, called myki, which would cover all public transport in the state. 
However, in February 2008, Victorian Public Transport Minister Lynne Kosky announced that the full roll out of the system would not begin until the end of 2008. Approximately 7 weeks later, the system was delayed for approximately another 2 years, with an announcement that the service was now scheduled to begin its roll out in 2009, but not be fully operational until some time in 2010. The system was finally introduced on 29 December 2009, but only for metropolitan train services, and was introduced on bus and tram services on 25 July 2010.

The two systems would coexist until the transition was complete. Metcard equipment was able to support a similar system based on re-usable RFID touch cards for use by public transport staff and other pass holders, however this provided neither the flexibility nor advantages intended to be available under by the myki system.

The new system was announced as a touch on / touch off system, where two validations are required per journey; one when boarding and again when alighting, similar to the London Underground's Oyster card system. This means passengers would have a single card and be charged for the actual fare used (flat rate fare). This is unlike Metcard where passengers who travel into different zones at different days and times may need to buy several types of Metcards beforehand.

Touch on / touch off has both benefits and costs. On the one hand, it allows fares to be automatically calculated, always giving the passenger the cheapest fare option and special off-peak fares to encourage travel during quiet times could be implemented, which is impossible with Metcard. The main disadvantage would be to passengers who do not touch off and who would therefore be charged the total fare for the trip they might have taken.

Following the change of government in November 2010, an enquiry was held into the future of myki, with various options considered including whether to proceed with it, modify its introduction, or scrap it altogether and retain Metcard. In June 2011, the Victorian Government confirmed that the roll-out of myki would continue and that Metcards would no longer be available after December 2012.

Withdrawal

The withdrawal of the Metcard system commenced on 2 January 2012 with the end of online and over-the-phone sales of Metcards, and the removal of yearly Metcards from sale. Other points of sale and Metcard types were progressively removed as Myki sales were introduced Melbourne-wide.  Metcard validators at railway stations were also progressively removed, while the process of replacing Metcard gates with Myki gates began.

By November 2012, only short-term Metcards (one day or less) could be purchased, and only on board trams and buses. Unused and partially used Metcards could still be used.

All remaining Metcards were withdrawn from sale at 3:00 am on 29 December 2012. From this date, remaining Metcard equipment was closed for use. Unused and partially used Metcards were no longer valid tickets.

During early 2013, the remaining Metcard gates at railway stations were replaced with Myki gates, while all other remaining Metcard equipment was progressively removed.

Below are some of the milestones of the withdrawal of Metcard:

 On 2 January 2012, the withdrawal of Metcard began, with the ending of online and over-the-phone sales of Metcards, and the withdrawal of yearly Metcards from sale.
 From January to March 2012, Myki sales from vending machines were rolled out across Melbourne metropolitan railway stations, major tram stops and bus interchanges.
 From late January to late July 2012, Metcard machines were shut down and removed from Melbourne metropolitan railway stations, commencing with Flagstaff Station in the week of 30 January - 3 February and culminating with the last Metcard vending machine being removed from Southern Cross station during the week of 23–27 July.  Metcard vending machines at other locations were also withdrawn during this time period.
 From February to April 2012, Metcards were progressively withdrawn from sale at retail outlets as Myki sales were progressively introduced.
 Weekly and monthly Metcards were withdrawn form sale on 26 March 2012, followed by "value" Metcards (all multi-period, Sunday Saver and off-peak daily Metcards) on 2 July.
 From late August 2012, Metcard sales at premium station ticket offices were progressively replaced by Myki sales or top ups, starting at Williamstown Station in the week of 27 August, and ending at Flagstaff station on 12 October.
 Starting at Flagstaff station on 12 October 2012, Metcard/Myki hybrid barriers at railway stations were progressively replaced with Myki-only barriers. This process is scheduled to continue through until March 2013.
 On 1 November 2012, the PTV Hub (Met Shop) in Swanston Street had ceased its Metcard sales which were replaced by Myki Devices.
 On 12 November 2012, the TTA announced that the progressive removal of Metcard validators at railway stations had commenced on a station-by-station basis. All railway station validators were removed by mid-December.
 Friday, 28 December 2012, was the final day of Metcard sales on trams and buses, as well as all other Metcard use. After this date, Metcard ticket vending machines on trams have been de-activated, meaning that passengers needed to have a Myki before boarding, or risk a fine.
 Starting from 29 December 2012, Metcard equipment including validators on buses and trams were de-activated after its switch off, meaning Melbourne bus passengers have to purchase a Myki before boarding.
 Starting from 1 February 2013, Metcard equipment including validators on buses were removed and the new Myki only top-ups and in mid February 2013, Metcard ticket machines and validators on trams were removed and replaced by the full Myki transition.
 On 30 June 2013, PTV ceased its Metcard refund and transfer to Myki service, which had allowed people with unused or partly used Metcards to transfer their remaining value to a new or existing Myki card.

See also
 Automated fare collection

References

External links
 Metlink fares & tickets – official website
 PTUA – Your Rights on Melbourne's Public Transport
 PTUA – Ticketing & Smartcard FAQ

Fare collection systems in Australia
Public transport in Melbourne
1998 establishments in Australia
2012 disestablishments in Australia